Richard G. Stein (1916-1990) was an American architect.

Biography
Stein was born in Chicago in 1916. He attended the New York University and Harvard University to study architecture. During the World War II, he served in the United States Army Corps of Engineers. He was married to Ethel, and they had a son, Carl.

His architectural work was surrounded by designs that conserve energy use. He found out that with a careful use of building materials and design, one can decrease energy use by 20 percent. In 1977, he published a book, Architecture and Energy, on this subject.

Between 1946 and 1960, he was associated with the firm Katz Waisman Blumenkranz Stein Weber, Architects Associated. He founded his firm, the Stein Partnership, in 1961.

Stein was a fellow of the American Institute of Architects. He died in 1990 in Tarrytown, New York at the age of 73.

Bibliography
 Architecture and Energy (1977)
 Handbook of Energy Use for Building Construction (1980)

References

American architects
20th-century American writers
Harvard University alumni

1916 births
1990 deaths